Samran Rat, popularly known as Pratu Phi, is a historic neighbourhood and road junction in Bangkok. The neighbourhood roughly occupies the area of its namesake subdistrict in Phra Nakhon district.

History
The name Pratu Phi means "ghost's gate", because the area used to be the location of the city gate used to transport dead bodies out of the fortified city for cremation during the early Rattanakosin period. Cremations were usually held at the nearby Wat Saket, just across the city moat of Khlong Rop Krung. The area was later officially named Samran Rat ("happiness citizen") for auspiciousness. But the name Pratu Phi remains in use by many people.

In modern times, Samran Rat is known as the hub of notable restaurants, serving a variety of Thai street food such as pad thai, yen ta fo, salapao as well as multiple traditional cafés (kopitiam). The neighbourhood's better known restaurants include Jay Fai, which received one Michelin Guide star in 2017, and Thipsamai, which is famous for pad thai.

Samran Rat is also home to the first pawn shop in Thailand. It has been operating since the reign of King Mongkut (Rama IV).

At the behind of the Mahakan Fort, one of the fortresses of Rattanakosin. It is the site of a Mahakan Fort Community where people in this community lived for a long time since the early Rattanakosin period. They are considered one of the oldest and most unique communities in Bangkok. But in the year 2018 their houses were ordered by the government and Bangkok Metropolitan Administration (BMA) to demolish and expel them from here, because to open the way to create a new urban park of Bangkok.

Geography
Samran Rat Intersection is a four-way intersection of Bamrung Mueang and Maha Chai roads. From the intersection, Bamrung Mueang road crosses the nearby Sommot Amonmak bridge into Pom Prap Sattru Phai district's Ban Bat subdistrict. The next junction on Bamrung Mueang is Maen Si.

Ruan Cham Junction is a T junction where Maha Chai and Luang roads meet. The point is known by this name because it used to be the location of the Special Bangkok Metropolitan Prison (ruan cham in Thai), built by the order of King Chulalongkorn (Rama V) in 1889. It served to detain and train prisoners so that they could become good citizens. Later in 1987, the Department of Corrections moved the prison from this place to where is now Khlong Prem Prison in Chatuchak district's Lat Yao subdistrict. BMA turned it into an urban park, named Rommaninat, to present to the Queen Sirikit on her fifth cycle birthday in 1992. Some of the buildings were developed into a Bangkok Corrections Museum.

Surroundings

Gallery

Notes

References

Neighbourhoods of Bangkok
Phra Nakhon district
Road junctions in Bangkok
Subdistricts of Bangkok